Casscoe (also Cassco or Cass Coe) is an unincorporated community in Arkansas County, Arkansas, United States. The community is located where Arkansas Highway 33 Spur diverges from Arkansas Highway 33.

Climate
The climate in this area is characterized by hot, humid summers and generally mild to cool winters.  According to the Köppen Climate Classification system, Casscoe has a humid subtropical climate, abbreviated "Cfa" on climate maps.

Education
Residents are in the Stuttgart School District. It operates Stuttgart High School.

References

Unincorporated communities in Arkansas County, Arkansas
Unincorporated communities in Arkansas